Jack T. Collis (January 12, 1923 – February 1, 1998) was an American art director. He was nominated for an Academy Award in the category Best Art Direction for the film The Last Tycoon. After studying architecture at the University of Southern California, he began his career as a set decorator at Metro-Goldwyn-Mayer.

Selected filmography
 The Last Tycoon (1976)

References

External links

1923 births
1998 deaths
American art directors
People from Los Angeles